Poonamallee Bypass metro station is a metro railway station on the Orange Line of the Chennai Metro. The station is among the 30 stations of corridor IV and 18 elevated stations along corridor IV of the Chennai Metro, Poonamallee Bypass–Lighthouse stretch. The station serves the neighbourhoods of Poonamallee.

History
Construction of the station began in 2021. The construction is being funded by Asian Infrastructure Investment Bank.

Depot
The Poonamallee Bypass metro station will feature a depot, which will be one of the five depots of the Chennai Metro. Built at a cost of 2,250 million, the depot will have 24 tracks and will be used for the repair, maintenance and cleaning of trains and will exclusively serve the trains to be operated on the Poonamallee–Light House stretch. The depot will feature ballast tracks to save on capital expenditure, since laying ballastless track my cost an additional 800 to 900 million.

See also
 List of Chennai metro stations
 Railway stations in Chennai
 Transport in Chennai
 Urban rail transit in India
 List of metro systems

References

External links

 
 UrbanRail.Net – descriptions of all metro systems in the world, each with a schematic map showing all stations.

Chennai Metro stations
Railway stations in Chennai